Laguna is a census-designated place (CDP) in Cibola County, New Mexico, United States. The population was 1,241 at the 2010 census. It is located approximately 47 miles west of Albuquerque.

Laguna was founded in 1699, making it the most recent of the New Mexican pueblos. The people of Laguna Pueblo speak Western Keresan. Laguna is home to an annual feast to Saint Joseph.

History
The San Jose de la Laguna Mission and Convento, built starting in 1699, is in Laguna.  It is extremely well-preserved, and has been listed on the National Register of Historic Places since 1973.

Anton Docher, the "Padre of Isleta", served as a priest in Laguna during his long period in Isleta.

Geography
Laguna is located in eastern Cibola County at  (35.047195, -107.403024). It is bordered to the west by Paraje, to the southeast by Mesita, and to the south by Interstate 40, which provides access from Exit 114. Old U.S. Route 66 passes through the community.

Demographics

As of the census of 2000, there were 423 people, 136 households, and 108 families residing in the CDP. The population density was 164.2 people per square mile (63.3/km2). There were 172 housing units at an average density of 66.8 per square mile (25.7/km2). The racial makeup of the CDP was 2.36% White, 96.45% Native American, 0.24% from other races, and 0.47% from two or more races. Hispanic or Latino of any race were 3.07% of the population.

There were 136 households, out of which 31.6% had children under the age of 18 living with them, 47.8% were married couples living together, 25.0% had a female householder with no husband present, and 19.9% were non-families. 17.6% of all households were made up of individuals, and 6.6% had someone living alone who was 65 years of age or older. The average household size was 3.11 and the average family size was 3.44.

In the CDP, the population was spread out, with 27.0% under the age of 18, 8.0% from 18 to 24, 28.6% from 25 to 44, 22.0% from 45 to 64, and 14.4% who were 65 years of age or older. The median age was 38 years. For every 100 females, there were 90.5 males. For every 100 females age 18 and over, there were 89.6 males.

The median income for a household in the CDP was $19,250, and the median income for a family was $19,750. Males had a median income of $19,000 versus $17,188 for females. The per capita income for the CDP was $10,980. About 28.6% of families and 27.1% of the population were below the poverty line, including 25.4% of those under age 18 and 30.9% of those age 65 or over.

Education
All public schools in the county are operated by Grants/Cibola County Schools.

Cubero Elementary School and Laguna Acoma Middle-High School serve the area.

There is a tribal elementary school, affiliated with the Bureau of Indian Education (BIE), called Laguna Elementary School.

See also

 List of census-designated places in New Mexico
 Laguna Pueblo

References

External links 

 

Census-designated places in Cibola County, New Mexico
Census-designated places in New Mexico
Populated places established in 1699
History of Cibola County, New Mexico
1699 establishments in New Spain